Galeandra nivalis is a species of orchid endemic to northern Brazil.

References

External links
 
 

nivalis
Orchids of Brazil
Plants described in 1882